Ukraine competed in the 2008 Summer Olympics. The country repeated its 2004 performance in terms of total medals, but its gold medal haul fell slightly from 8 to 7.

Medalists

Archery

Ukraine's men's archery team took seventh place at the 2007 World Outdoor Target Championships, earning the nation a full complement of three qualification spots for the Olympic men's competitions. The women's team finished in tenth place, six points shy of qualifying as well. Nevertheless, two Ukrainian women (Tetyana Berezhna and Viktoriya Koval) did earn spots via individual qualification in that tournament.

Ukraine has won a silver medal and two bronzes in previous Games, including the bronze medal in the men's team competition in 2004. Viktor Ruban, a member of that 2004 Men's team survived two tie-breaker shots in the semifinals, before beating a Korean opponent by one point in the final to claim the individual gold medal.

Men

Women

Athletics

Key
 Note – Ranks given for track events are within the athlete's heat only
 Q = Qualified for the next round
 q = Qualified for the next round as a fastest loser or, in field events, by position without achieving the qualifying target
 NR = National record
 N/A = Round not applicable for the event
 Bye = Athlete not required to compete in round

Men
Track & road events

Field events

Combined events – Decathlon

Women
Track & road events

Field events

Combined events – Heptathlon

* Both Natalya Dobrynska and Lyudmila Blonska originally won medals in the heptathlon, but after Blonska tested positive for the banned substance methyltestosterone, she was stripped of her silver medal, which went to the United States' Hyleas Fountain.

Badminton

Boxing

Ukraine qualified eight boxers for the Olympic boxing tournament. Chygayev, Lomachenko, Dervyanchenko, and Glazkov earned their spots at the 2007 World Championships. The remaining four Ukrainian boxers qualified at the first European qualifying tournament.

Vasyl Lomachenko had an outstanding tournament winning all his bouts convincingly and finishing with gold medal victory in the final when the referee stopped the fight.

Canoeing

Sprint 
Men

Women

Qualification Legend: QS = Qualify to semi-final; QF = Qualify directly to final

Cycling

Road
Men

Women

Track
Ukraine qualified a men's team pursuit entry, along with Volodymyr Dyudya in the individual pursuit, and Lesya Kalytovska in the women's pursuit and points race.

Pursuit

Keirin

Omnium

Mountain biking

Diving

Men

Women

Equestrian

Jumping

Fencing

Ukraine qualified teams in both Women's sabre and Men's épée, along with individuals in both women's épée and foil. The Ukrainian women's sabre team captured their nation's first gold medal at the 2008 Olympic Games.

Men

Women

Gymnastics

Artistic
Men

Women
Team

Individual finals

Rhythmic
Ukraine have qualified a group and two individuals for Beijing.

Trampoline

Judo

Men

Women

Modern pentathlon

Rowing

Men

Women

Qualification Legend: FA=Final A (medal); FB=Final B (non-medal); FC=Final C (non-medal); FD=Final D (non-medal); FE=Final E (non-medal); FF=Final F (non-medal); SA/B=Semifinals A/B; SC/D=Semifinals C/D; SE/F=Semifinals E/F; QF=Quarterfinals; R=Repechage

Sailing

Men

Women

Open

M = Medal race; EL = Eliminated – did not advance into the medal race; CAN = Race cancelled; OCS – On the course side: boat was disqualified for being on the course side of the start line before the start signal and failing to return and re-cross the start line.

Shooting

Artur Ayvazyan who had won a pre-Olympic event in Milan, Italy, won the gold medal in the men's 50 metre prone rifle event in Beijing. His teammate Oleksandr Petriv also won a gold medal in the 25 metre rapid fire pistol event with a come-from-behind effort.

Men

Women

Swimming

Men

Women

Synchronized swimming

Table tennis

Tennis

Triathlon

Weightlifting 

Men

Women

* Ihor Razoronov who finished sixth in the men's under-105 kg class, was expelled from the Beijing Olympics after failing a doping test.

Wrestling

Key
  – Victory by Fall.
  – Decision by Points – the loser with technical points.
  – Decision by Points – the loser without technical points.

Men's freestyle

Men's Greco-Roman

Women's freestyle

See also
 Ukraine at the 2008 Summer Paralympics

References 

Nations at the 2008 Summer Olympics
2008
Summer Olympics